The 2020 FC Kaisar season was the club's fourth season back in the Kazakhstan Premier League, the highest tier of association football in Kazakhstan, and 23rd in total. As well as participating in the Kazakhstan Premier League, Kaisar will defend their title in the Kazakhstan Cup. On 29 February they began their season losing 1–0 to Astana in the Kazakhstan Super Cup.

Season events
On 13 March, the Football Federation of Kazakhstan announced all league fixtures would be played behind closed doors for the foreseeable future due to the COVID-19 pandemic. On 16 March the Football Federation of Kazakhstan suspended all football until 15 April.

On 30 May, the Professional Football League of Kazakhstan announced that Irtysh Pavlodar had withdrawn from the league due to financial issues, with all their matches being excluded from the league results.

On 26 July, it was announced that the league would resume on 1 July, with no fans being permitted to watch the games. The league was suspended for a second time on 3 July, for an initial two weeks, due to an increase in COVID-19 cases in the country.

Squad

Transfers

In

Loans in

Out

Released

Competitions

Super Cup

Premier League

Results summary

Results by round

Results

League table

Kazakhstan Cup

UEFA Europa League

Qualifying rounds

Squad statistics

Appearances and goals

|-
|colspan="14"|Players away from Kaisar on loan:
|-
|colspan="14"|Players who left Kaisar during the season:

|}

Goal scorers

Clean sheets

Disciplinary record

References

FC Kaisar seasons
Kaisar